Service de protection contre les incendies de Québec (SPCIQ, Quebec City Fire Protection Service) is responsible for fire prevention and suppression in Quebec City, Quebec, Canada. However, the fire department's field of competence is not limited to this; they respond to vehicle accidents, hazardous materials (HAZMAT) calls, electrical hazards, floods, wildfires and many other situations in which citizens are in need of external help.

History

Professional fire fighting in Quebec began in 1765, but the current force was created by amalgamation of several area fire services in 2002:

 Québec: provided fire protection to Charlesbourg, Beauport and Vanier before amalgamation
 Sainte-Foy: provided fire protection to Cap-Rouge and l'Ancienne-Lorette
 Sillery
 Val-Bélair
 Loretteville
 Saint-Émile
 Lac Saint-Charles
 Saint-Augustin-de-Desmaures
 Duberger
 Neufchâtel

Despite presence of a fire service, Quebec suffered two devastating fires:

Quebec fires of 1845

In 1845 Quebec would face two devastating fires resulting in 50 deaths, 3000 buildings lost, 22,000 residents losing their homes or business and caused extensive damage to the two-thirds of the city outside of the Fortification thus sparing Old Quebec (La Basse-Ville de Québec):

 May 28 - the first fire that began in a tannery on rue Arago and burned down wood structures in the Lower Town and Saint Roch area
 June 28 - the second fire began in the Upper Town, in St. Jean (Saint-Jean-Baptiste) and St. Louis (Parliament Hill)

Great Fire of Quebec 1866

A fire at a store on rue St. Joseph on 14 October 1866 resulted in 2500-3000 buildings lost, 7 deaths and 20,000 residents homeless. Wind and lack of water resulted in extensive damage (significant part of St. Sauver razed) but Saint Roch was spared with less fire damage.

Ranks

Besides regular firefighter, SPCIQ has other ranks:

 Logistics platoon leader
 Chief of logistics operations
 Platoon leader
 Chief operating officer
 Chief of operations
 Platoon chief
 SST platoon chief
 Deputy director - operations
 Deputy director - strategic and administrative affairs
 Director

Operations

There are 16 stations with no station 14 assigned:

Innovations

Quebec is one of a few fire services outside of Europe using the Gallet F1 helmet forgoing the traditional leatherhead or structural helmets used in North America. Quebec is the oldest service using aerial tiller truck, most other fire departments in Canada abandoned their use.

Marine rescue

Quebec City uses small vessels with outboard motor mainly for marine rescue operations. Known vessels include:

 Airsolid 16' inflatable rescue boat
 NAV 16 inflatable rescue boat

Rapid Deployment Craft are unpowered inflatable vessel used for ice rescue operations.

Major fire suppression can be assisted by Canadian Coast Guard vessels stationed nearby along the St. Lawrence River. Marine rescue is further enhanced by the Maritime Rescue Sub-Centre Quebec.

See also

 Service de police de la Ville de Québec

References

External links
 Quebec City Fire Department
 Quebec City Firefighters' Union

Quebec
2002 establishments in Quebec
Municipal government of Quebec City